Ignacio or Nacho Rodríguez may refer to:
Ignacio Rodríguez Galván (1816–1842), Mexican romantic writer
Ignacio Rodriguez-Iturbe (born 1942), Venezuelan hydrologist
Ignacio Rodríguez (footballer) (born 1956), Mexican footballer
Ignacio Rodríguez (basketball) (born 1970), a Spanish basketball player
José Ignacio Rodríguez (born 1979), Venezuelan model
Nacho Rodríguez (footballer) (born 1982), Spanish footballer
Juan Ignacio Rodríguez (born 1992), Spanish archer
Ignacio Rodríguez (field hockey) (born 1996), Spanish field hockey player
Ignacio Rodríguez (programmer) (born 1999), Uruguayan programmer